Aathma Balam is a 1964 Indian Telugu-language romantic thriller film directed by V. Madhusudhana Rao and produced by V. B. Rajendra Prasad. The film stars Akkineni Nageswara Rao, B. Saroja Devi and Jaggayya, with music composed by K. V. Mahadevan. It is a remake of the Bengali film Agni Sanskar (1961).

Plot 
Rama Rao, a millionaire, commits suicide out of fury as he suspects his wife Jagadeeswari Devi. The incident is witnessed by his son Kumar which makes a huge impact on him and turns him into a psycho. So, Jagadeeswari Devi admits Kumar to a psychiatric center but to protect the family prestige she lies to society that her son is studying aboard. Years roll by, and Kumar grows up as a peculiar loner with his father's memories. Meanwhile, Anand (Akkineni Nageswara Rao) a wise gentleman works as a chief engineer at Jagadeeswari Devi's factory whom she treats as her own. Anand loves a beautiful girl Jaya (B. Saroja Devi) who spouse to be Jagadeeswari's driver's daughter. The person who has sacrificed his life while guarding his owner for which Jagadeeswari Devi has nurtured Jaya. On the other side, Mangapathi (Ramana Reddy) factory manager always grudges Anand as he creates obstacles for his misdeeds.

Once, unfortunately, Kumar absconds from the psychiatric center when Jagadeeswari Devi reveals the hidden secret and requests Anand to get back her son. So, Anand moves in search of Kumar, after crossing many hurdles he makes friends with Kumar and successfully brings him home. But perturbed Kumar cannot stay there when Anand lures him with Jaya's beauty. At that moment, Kumar falls for her and expresses the intention of marrying her to his mother and she pleads Anand to convince Jaya. At present, to show gratitude, both sacrifice their love, Anand reigns and leaves the town.

Thereafter, Mangapathi spoils Kumar's mind by divulging the love affair of Anand and Jaya. As Kumar becomes very adamant about getting whatever he yearns for, if not, he doesn't hesitate to kill the opponent or abuse himself. So, Kumar plots to take avenge by calling back Anand and tries to slaughter him but it fails. Here Anand cautions Kumar and quits but lunatic Kumar attempts to slay Jaya when she flees and reaches Anand. Right now, Kumar as a home straight intrigues Anand by committing suicide, cleverly indicting Anand in it and the court gives the death sentence.

During that plight, Jaya meets Jagadeeswari Devi and she enrages her. By that time, fortunately, Kumar's Doctor Seth (Gummadi) and Jagadeeswari Devi's ex-lover Sundaram (V. Nagayya) had also arrived. The people make her realize that Kumar is insane and Anand is innocent. Parallelly, Jaya learns Kumar also has a habit of writing his innermost feeling in a diary which Mangapathi tries to destroy but with her willpower Jaya achieves it. Just before Anand is at death's door, Jaya proves his innocence and acquits him. Finally, the movie ends on a happy note with the marriage of Anand and Jaya.

Cast 
Akkineni Nageswara Rao as Anand
B. Saroja Devi as Jaya
Jaggayya as Kumar
Gummadi as Dr. Seth
V. Nagayya as Sundaram
Relangi as Kuramavataram
Ramana Reddy as Manager Mangapathi
Chadalavada as Anand's father
Suryakantham as Rangamma
Kannamba as Jagadeeswaramma
Hemalatha as Parvathamma
Girija as Chitti

Soundtrack 
Music was composed by K. V. Mahadevan. Lyrics were written by Acharya Aatreya.

References

External links 

1960s Telugu-language films
1960s thriller drama films
1964 films
Films directed by V. Madhusudhana Rao
Films scored by K. V. Mahadevan
Indian thriller drama films
Telugu remakes of Bengali films